Boris Michael Martin (March 28, 1920 – August 1, 2013) was a Major League Baseball outfielder for the St. Louis Browns (1944–46 and 1953) and a catcher for the Boston Red Sox (1948–49). He was nicknamed 'Babe'.

Biography
Martin was born Boris Michael Martinovich in Seattle, Washington to Serbian immigrant parents. The Martinovich family then moved to Zeigler, Illinois, when Babe was a boy, and subsequently moved to St. Louis, Missouri after the death of Babe's father. He started his professional baseball career in 1940 and had a breakout year in 1944 with the Toledo Mud Hens, batting .350 in 114 games. The following season, he joined the Major League Browns. He hit poorly and was sent back down to the minors. Martin retired in 1954. In 69 Major League games, he had 2 home runs, 18 RBIs, and a .214 batting average.

In later years, Martin still held a grudge against one-armed outfielder Pete Gray, who was a teammate in 1945. "The worst thing that happened to our ballclub in 1945, which we should have won the pennant, was Pete Gray", he said. "And honestly I think if we hadn't had Pete ... we could have won the pennant in 1945." Although Martin's batting average that season was actually 18 points lower than Gray's, Martin was referring to Pete Gray's fielding ability. Because Gray only had one arm, his throws back into the infield were slowed because he had to remove his glove from his one hand, get the ball, and throw into the infield. This slowed him down and allowed runners to advance more easily than they otherwise would have.  The Browns finished in third place in the American League, six games behind the Detroit Tigers.

Charlie Metro was Martin's teammate during Martin's lone season with the Oakland Oaks in 1946.  He shared this anecdote: "Babe Martin came to us out from St. Louis.  He was in the Browns organization at one time, and I knew him from that.  He was a catcher.  We were playing in Portland one day when some leather-lunged fan was giving him a good roasting.  Portland had a dugout that sloped down kind of like a sunken shed.  Babe had taken just about all that he could take from this heckler who was sitting right up there, and he took a running start and jumped up on the roof of the dugout, scrambling up, crawling up, wanting to get the guy, shin guards, mask, and all.  He was going to get him, but he couldn't make it.  He kept sliding down.  Finally somebody grabbed him by his shoes and pulled him back down.  He later became a councilperson or something in St. Louis."

References

External links

1920 births
2013 deaths
American people of Serbian descent
Baseball players from Seattle
Boston Red Sox players
Dallas Eagles players
Louisville Colonels (minor league) players
Major League Baseball left fielders
Navegantes del Magallanes players
American expatriate baseball players in Venezuela
Oakland Oaks (baseball) players
Palestine Pals players
Paragould Browns players
People from Zeigler, Illinois
San Antonio Missions players
Baseball players from St. Louis
Springfield Browns players
St. Joseph Autos players
St. Louis Browns players
Toledo Mud Hens players
Tyler Trojans players
American Association (1902–1997) MVP Award winners